Banana Fish is a 2018 anime television series adapted from the 1985 manga of the same name by Akimi Yoshida. The series was produced and animated by MAPPA, while development, promotion, and distribution was overseen by Aniplex. The primary production staff includes Hiroko Utsumi as director, Hiroshi Seko as scriptwriter,  as character designer, and Shinichi Osawa as sound director. Banana Fish follows the relationship between Ash Lynx, a teenage gang leader in New York City, and Eiji Okumura, a Japanese photographer's assistant. The adaption revises the setting of the manga from the 1980s to the late 2010s, adding modern references such as smartphones and substituting the Vietnam War with the Iraq War.

The Banana Fish anime adaption was greenlit by Shogakukan, which published the original manga, based on a story proposal from Aniplex animation producer Kyōko Uryū. Uryū pitched the series for a 2018 release to coincide with the 40th anniversary of Yoshida's debut as a manga artist; the series would ultimately become part of a broader commemoration project to mark Yoshida's career. Utsumi was appointed as series director at Uryū's recommendation, and her decision to set Banana Fish in the present day led MAPPA CEO Manabu Ootsuka to agree to animate the series. The series' voice actors were determined by Utsumi, Osawa, and Yoshida, who cast Kenji Nojima as Eiji, and subsequently cast Yuma Uchida as Ash based on his compatibility with Nojima's performance. Location scouting for the series was overseen by Utsumi and Seko, who traveled to New York City to conduct interviews and observe locations depicted in the original manga.

Banana Fish was publicly announced at midnight on October 22, 2017 through Yoshida's website, social media, and screens at Ikebukuro Station in Tokyo, Japan. The trailer for the series was released on February 22, 2018, alongside an announcement of the series' primary voice cast. In Japan, Banana Fish aired on Fuji TV's late-night Noitamina programming block from July 5 to December 20, 2018. It is syndicated by Amazon Video, which simulcast the series internationally during its original broadcast run. The series consists of two cours for a total of 24 episodes, with each episode title referencing a literary work by a writer of the Lost Generation. Aniplex encapsulated the series into four volumes, in DVD and Blu-ray formats.

The series uses four pieces of theme music: two opening and two closing themes. Episodes 1–13 use "found & lost" by Survive Said The Prophet as the opening theme, and "Prayer X" by King Gnu as the closing theme.

Episode list

Television series

Audio drama
The audio drama episodes are character voices, music, and sound effects used to tell a story. In Japan, audio dramas were included with certain volumes of the DVD and Blu-ray releases, and adapt scenes from the original manga not included in the anime adaptation. The first collected volume included "Angel Eyes", while the fourth volume included the five-part audio drama "Five Stories".

Media release

Japanese release
Aniplex released Banana Fish across four volumes, in DVD and Blu-ray media formats.

References

External links
  
 
 

Banana Fish
Akimi Yoshida